Philip Kenneth Bloss (born 16 January 1953) is an English former professional footballer who played as a midfielder in the Football League.

References

1953 births
Living people
Sportspeople from Colchester
English footballers
Association football midfielders
Colchester United F.C. players
Wimbledon F.C. players
English Football League players